"Busy" is the first single released from Lyfe Jennings' fourth album I Still Believe on February 23, 2010. Busy reached number 39 on the Billboard R&B/hip hop chart.

References

2010 singles
Lyfe Jennings songs
2010 songs